Ouadjana  is a town and commune in Jijel Province, Algeria. According to the 1998 census it has a population of 8612.

References

Communes of Jijel Province
Cities in Algeria
Algeria